Glenkinchie distillery is a Scotch single malt whisky distillery in East Lothian, Scotland. It is one of the six distilleries in the Lowland region. It is owned by the drinks giant Diageo.

The Distillery

Glenkinchie lies, as the name might suggest, in a glen of the Kinchie Burn near the village of Pencaitland, East Lothian.  It is situated about 15 miles from Edinburgh.  The distillery is set in farmland.  The name 'Kinchie' is a corruption of 'De Quincy', the original owners of the land.  Its origins date back to around 1825 when it was founded by brothers John and George Rate, While there are no direct records it seems likely that Glenkinchie is the Milton Distillery previous recorded in the area.  The brothers probably renamed it in about 1837. In 1853, the Rate Brothers were bankrupted and the site converted to a sawmill.

In 1881, the plant was rebuilt and whisky-making restarted under Maj. James Grey.

In 1969 the distillery stopped malting its own grain and the malting floors were turned into a museum of malt whisky.

The Glenkinchie label was relatively little known until 1989, when United Distillers started marketing it under their Classic Malts brand.

Expressions 

Glenkinchie 12 Year Old
Tasting notes: On the nose aromatic and floral notes. On the palate it is sweet with a slight liquorice aftertaste and a dry finish.

Glenkinchie Distillers Edition
Tasting notes: On the nose cut hay and malted barley. On the palate, biscuity sweet, digestives and hobnobs. Slight toffee finish.

The Glenkinchie 12 Year Old was named Best Lowland Single Malt at the 2013 World Whiskies Awards.

See also
 Whisky
 Scotch whisky
 List of whisky brands
 List of distilleries in Scotland

References

External links

 Glenkinchie

Distilleries in Scotland
1825 establishments in Scotland
Companies based in East Lothian
Diageo brands
Scottish brands
Scottish malt whisky
Food and drink companies established in 1825